Lower Penn is a village in South Staffordshire, situated to the south-west of Wolverhampton, West Midlands.

The Civil Parish covers the area of the historic Parish of Penn that is not now covered by the city of Wolverhampton and thus covers a wider area than that immediately surrounding the village. Part of the parish is considered by the ONS to be part of the Wolverhampton sub-area of the West Midlands conurbation.

Lower Penn has a village hall known as Victory Hall, and a pub/restaurant, The Greyhound.

Notable people 
 John Clarkson Major (1826 – 1895 in Lower Penn) a successful manufacturing chemist who set up the first tar distillery in Wolverhampton, Major & Company Ltd. He served as Mayor of Wolverhampton 1873/74.
 Dave Hill (born 1946) an English musician, lead guitarist and backing vocalist in the English band Slade; known for his flamboyant stage clothes and hairstyle. He lives in Lower Penn with his wife and three children.
 Warren Bullock (born 1965) a professional ballroom dancer and dance teacher. He lives in Lower Penn with his wife and their three children
 Anya Chalotra (born 1996) an English actress, known for her roles in Wanderlust and The Witcher TV series. She grew up in Lower Penn with her family.

See also
Listed buildings in Lower Penn

References

External links 

Villages in Staffordshire
South Staffordshire District